Matthew Diamond Lagan (June 20, 1829 – April 8, 1901) was a U.S. Representative from Louisiana's 2nd congressional district from 1887 to 1889 and 1891 to 1893. He was a Democrat.

Lagan was born in Maghera, County Londonderry, Ireland, and immigrated to the United States at age 14. In New Orleans, he fitted out vessels for the Confederate Navy, and served in the Confederate Navy himself. He was elected to terms on the New Orleans City Council in 1867 and 1882. After serving his first term in Congress, he chose not to run for reelection, but then ran in 1890 and defeated his successor, Hamilton D. Coleman.

Lagan died in New Orleans, Louisiana on April 8, 1901 and is buried in Metairie Cemetery.

External links

1829 births
1901 deaths
People of Louisiana in the American Civil War
New Orleans City Council members
Irish emigrants to the United States (before 1923)
People from Maghera
Democratic Party members of the United States House of Representatives from Louisiana
19th-century American politicians